Donald Fred Owens (April 3, 1932 – August 17, 1997) was an American football defensive tackle and offensive tackle in the National Football League (NFL) for the Washington Redskins, the Philadelphia Eagles, and the St. Louis Cardinals.

Born in St. Louis, Missouri, Owens played college football at the University of Southern Mississippi and was drafted in the third round of the 1957 NFL Draft by the Pittsburgh Steelers.

External links
 

1932 births
American football defensive linemen
Southern Miss Golden Eagles football players
Washington Redskins players
Philadelphia Eagles players
St. Louis Cardinals (football) players
Players of American football from St. Louis
1997 deaths